The Australian Journal of Political Science is a quarterly peer-reviewed academic journal that covers a wide range of fields political studies and international relations, including Australian politics, comparative politics, policy studies, political theory and foreign policy. The journal was established in 1966 as Politics and obtained its current name in 1990. It is published by Routledge and is the official journal of the Australian Political Studies Association. The editors-in-chief are Renee Jeffery and Annika Werner (Griffith University).

Abstracting and indexing
The journal is abstracted and indexed in:

According to the Journal Citation Reports, the journal has a 2017 impact factor of 0.722.

References

External links
 

Political science journals
English-language journals
Quarterly journals
Routledge academic journals
Publications established in 1966
Political science in Australia
1966 establishments in Australia